In English architecture, mainly from the Tudor period onwards, a banqueting house is a separate pavilion-like building reached through the gardens from the main residence, whose use is purely for entertaining, especially eating.  Or it may be built on the roof of a main house, as in many 16th-century prodigy houses. It may be raised for additional air or a vista, with a simple kitchen below, as at Hampton Court Palace and Wrest Park, and it may be richly decorated, but it normally contains no bedrooms, and typically a single grand room apart from any service spaces.  The design is often ornamental, if not downright fanciful, and some are also follies, as in Paxton's Tower.  There are usually plenty of windows, as appreciating the view was a large part of their purpose.  Often they are built on a slope, so that from the front, only the door to the main room can be seen; the door to the servants' spaces underneath was hidden at the back (Wrest Park). The Banqueting House, Gibside is an example.

In the English of the period, "banquet" had two distinct meanings: firstly a grand formal celebratory meal (the usual modern sense), but also a course or light meal taken in a special place away from the main dining place, the relevant sense here (Whitehall apart).  In large meals a banqueting house was most likely to be used for eating dessert, if reasonably close to the main house.  Otherwise it might be used on fine days for taking tea, or any kind of drink, snack or meal. 

The best known example, though far larger than most, is the Banqueting House on Whitehall, once part of Whitehall Palace. This is a grand dining hall for full formal meals, and what may be called in distinction a banqueting hall. Such buildings were created in various settings, for example at Cholmley House next to Whitby Abbey, which had been converted into a country house.  Most banqueting houses fitted at most twenty people, and many fewer.  Its contemporary Italian equivalent was a casina.

See also
 Palace of Facets

Notes

References

Girouard, Mark, Life in the English Country House: A Social and Architectural History 1978, Yale, Penguin etc.
Jenkins, Simon, England's Thousand Best Houses, 2003, Allen Lane, 

Architecture in England
Elizabethan architecture
Houses